Philadelphia Union is an American professional soccer team based in Chester, Pennsylvania, that competes in Major League Soccer (MLS).

This is a list of franchise records for Philadelphia, which dates from their inaugural season in 2010 to present.

Honors 
Supporters' Shield
 Winners: 2020
U.S. Open Cup
 Runners-up (3): 2014, 2015, 2018

Player records

Appearances 

As of October 22, 2022 (All competitive matches): 

Bold signifies current Union player

Goalscorers 

As of October 22, 2022 (All competitive matches): 

Bold signifies current Union player

Shutouts 

As of October 22, 2022 (All competitive matches): 

Bold signifies current Union player

Year-by-year

Coaching records

Transfer records

Highest transfer fees paid

Highest transfer fees received

Designated Players

  Cristian Maidana 
  Kléberson 
  Bořek Dočkal
  Marco Fabián
 Freddy Adu
  Alejandro Bedoya
  Maurice Edu 
  Fernando Aristeguieta 
  Jamiro Monteiro
  Julián Carranza
  Mikael Uhre

Bold signifies current Union player

Homegrown Players

  Cristhian Hernández 
  Anthony Fontana
  Derrick Jones
  Mark McKenzie
  Jimmy McLaughlin
  Zach Pfeffer
  Matthew Real
  Auston Trusty
  Brenden Aaronson
  Jack de Vries
  Matt Freese
  Cole Turner
  Nathan Harriel
  Jack McGlynn
  Paxten Aaronson
  Brandan Craig
  Quinn Sullivan
  Anton Sorenson
  Jeremy Rafanello
Bold signifies current Union player

Notes

References

Philadelphia Union
Philadelphia Union
Philadelphia Union records and statistics